Sven Adam Albert Ohlsson  (14 February 1888 – 27 December 1947) was a Swedish football player who competed in the 1908 Summer Olympics. In the 1908 tournament, he was a part of the Swedish football team that finished in 4th place.

References

External links

1888 births
1947 deaths
Swedish footballers
Sweden international footballers
Olympic footballers of Sweden
Footballers at the 1908 Summer Olympics
Association football forwards